The 1994–95 season is the Esteghlal Football Club's 3rd season in the Azadegan League, and their 1st season in the top division of Iranian football after promotion. Esteghlal was also competing in the Hazfi Cup, and it was its 50th year in existence as a football club.

Player 
As of 29 September 2018.

Pre-season and friendlies

Emirates Vahdat Cup

Competitions

Overview

Tehran Super Cup

Standings

Matches

Azadegan League

Standings 
Group A

Semi-final

Final

Hazfi Cup

See also 
 1994–95 Azadegan League
 1994–95 Hazfi Cup

References

External links 
 RSSSF

1994–95
Esteghlal